Paul Hacker (6 January 1913 — 18 March 1979) was a German Indologist, who coined the term Neo-Vedanta in a pejorative way, to distinguish modern developments from "traditional" Advaita Vedanta.

Publications
 Hacker, Paul (1965), Dharma in Hinduism

References

Sources

Further reading
 
 

German Indologists
1913 births
1979 deaths